A Wake in Providence (also titled Almost Married) is a 1999 American independent comedy film that is the directorial debut of Rosario Roveto Jr. It stars Vincent Pagano, who also co-wrote the screenplay, and Victoria Rowell.

Premise
When Anthony's African-American girlfriend Alissa meets his Italian-American family at his grandfather's funeral, confrontations, confessions, and a hilarious race to the altar ensue!

Cast
Vincent Pagano as Anthony
Victoria Rowell as Alissa
Mike Pagano as Frankie
Adrienne Barbeau as Aunt Lidia
Micole Mercurio as Aunt Elaine
Lisa Raggio as Claudia
Dan Lauria as Rudy
Kaye Kingston as Gram Baldassarre
Louis Guss as Uncle Guy
Sam Coppola as Uncle Joe
John Capodice as Uncle Sal
Mark DeCarlo as Vinnie
Jane Milmore as Patty
John Mariano as Brunie
Billy Van Zandt as Louie
Magda Harout as Aunt Alma

References

External links
 
 

1999 films
American independent films
American comedy films
Films set in Rhode Island
Italian-American culture in Providence, Rhode Island
1999 directorial debut films
1999 comedy films
1990s English-language films
1990s American films